Iris Yamashita is a Japanese-American screenwriter.

She was hired by Clint Eastwood to write the Japanese side of the story of the Battle of Iwo Jima, once rumored to be titled Lamps Before the Wind, then called Red Sun, Black Sand, before being released as Letters from Iwo Jima.  She was nominated in 2007 for the Academy Award for Best Original Screenplay.

Her first novel, City Under One Roof, will be published in January 2023.

References

External links
Official Website

American writers of Japanese descent
American screenwriters
Living people
Year of birth missing (living people)